Independente Sport Clube, formerly Independente de Porto Alexandre, is an Angolan football club based in the town of Tômbwa in Angola's southern province of Namibe.

In 1969, 70 and 71 the team has won the Angolan Provincial Championship.

League & Cup Positions

Honours
 Angolan Provincial Championship: 3
 1969, 1970, 1971
Angolan Super Cup: 1
 1995

Players

Manager history

See also
 Girabola
 Gira Angola

External links

References

Football clubs in Angola